Henry Cotterill  (1812 – 16 April 1886) was an Anglican bishop serving in South Africa in the second half of the 19th century. From 1872 until death he was a bishop of the Scottish Episcopal Church in Edinburgh.

Early life 

Cotterill was born in Ampton in 1812 into an ecclesiastical family of committed Church Evangelicals.  His father, Joseph Cotterill (1780 – 1858), was Rector of Blakeney, Norfolk, and a prebendary of Norwich Cathedral. His mother, Anne Boak, was a close friend of Hannah More. Educated at his father's old college, St John's College, Cambridge, he was both Senior Wrangler and headed the list of Classicists in 1835, on the strength of which he was elected as a Fellow of his college. Influenced by Charles Simeon, he was ordained in 1836 and went to India as Chaplain to the Madras Presidency the following year. Forced by malaria to return to England in 1846, he became inaugural Vice Principal and then the second Principal of Brighton College. In post less than six years, he reinvigorated the languishing infant school. In a whirlwind of energetic reform, he overhauled the curriculum by introducing the teaching of the sciences and oriental languages, restored discipline, launched a fund to build a chapel, built the first on-site boarding house and connected the school to the town's gas supply.

Bishop of Grahamstown 

At the suggestion of Anthony Ashley-Cooper, 7th Earl of Shaftesbury and John Sumner, Archbishop of Canterbury, he was nominated and consecrated in 1856 as the second colonial Bishop of Grahamstown in South Africa. As was then customary, he was simultaneously created a Doctor of Divinity (DD).

Cotterill was consecrated on 23 November 1856, and arrived in Grahamstown in May 1857. Bishop Cotterill's episcopate was occupied with the
development and consolidation of his diocese, and with the institution of diocesan and provincial synods. The opening service of the first synod of the diocese was held in the Grahamstown Cathedral on 20 June 1860. It may be of interest to record
that H. Blaine and F. Carlisle were the representatives of the Cathedral congregation at the synod.

As one of the bishops of South Africa, he sat in judgement in December 1863 on John Colenso, Bishop of Natal, his college friend from Cambridge days.

Translation to Edinburgh 

He was translated to Edinburgh in 1871 as coadjutor bishop of the Scottish Episcopal Church, and was created a full diocesan bishop in 1872.

During his time in Edinburgh he resided at 10 North Manor Place (later renumbered as 56 Manor Place), just north of his place of worship St Mary's Cathedral.

From 1875 to 1881, he served as one of the founding Council members of the Cockburn Association, a campaigning conservation group established in 1875 to protect and preserve Edinburgh's built and natural heritage.

He died in post in Edinburgh in 1886 and was buried between the choir stalls in the cathedral. His grave is covered by a large memorial brass made by Francis Skidmore of Coventry.

Family life 

In 1836 he married Anna Isabella Parnther (1812-1899)       who had been born in Jamaica.

They had at least two daughters and four sons. The four boys all attended Brighton College. George Edward (1839 – 1913), a Cambridge cricket blue and Sussex cricketer, was briefly Headmaster of St. Andrew's College, Grahamstown (1863 – 65) before returning to teach at Brighton College (1865 – 81). Henry Bernard (1846 – 1924) was an African missionary explorer and writer. Joseph Montagu Cotterill (1851 – 1933) played cricket for Sussex and became President of the Royal College of Surgeons of Edinburgh and was knighted. Arthur John (1849 – 1915) was Engineer-in-Chief, Egyptian Railways.

His brother George was on the teaching staff of Brighton College 1849 – 51 before emigrating to New Zealand while, intriguingly, his youngest brother, James Henry, was a pupil at the school while he was the Principal. James Henry became Professor of Applied Mathematics at the Royal Naval College, Greenwich (1873 – 97) and was elected a Fellow of the Royal Society in 1878.

Published works 

His published works include

Notes and references

Sources

External links
 

1812 births
Alumni of St John's College, Cambridge
Headmasters of Brighton College
People from the Borough of St Edmundsbury
Senior Wranglers
Fellows of St John's College, Cambridge
19th-century English Anglican priests
Anglican bishops of Grahamstown
Bishops of Edinburgh
19th-century Anglican Church of Southern Africa bishops
1886 deaths